The Battle of Mocopulli (Spanish: Batalla de Mocopulli) was fought on April 1 of 1824 as the culmination of a Chilean patriots invasion plan against royalist Chiloé. The battle concluded in a royalist victory that delayed the incorporation of Chiloé into Chile to 1826 when a new invasion was launched.

During all off the Chilean Independence War Chiloé Archipelago had remained under control of the royalist which enjoyed a wide support in the archipelago. In 1820 Lord Cochrane, with the newly created Chilean Navy, had disembarked William Miller in Chiloé to capture the island for Chile. Cochrane's hoped to repeat the success at Valdivia where he with only 350 men had captured the largest Spanish defensive complex in Chile. William Miller's 60-men strong expedition suffered heavy casualties in the Battle of Agüi and had to retreat back to the ships. When Ramón Freire came to power as supreme director of Chile in 1823, one of his first actions was to plan the capture of Chiloé. Freire's invasion army crossed Chacao Channel in March 1824. The troops occupied without resistance the village of Chacao and then continued south and disembarked in the town of Dalcahue. The Chilean plan was to perform a pincer movement and head north to attack San Carlos de Chiloé (Ancud) from Dalcahue while troops disembarked in the north of the island. The Chiloé royalists ambushed the Chileans in a glade and only after some hours could the Chileans retreat to Dalcahue and sail back to Chile.

Sources
LA Batalla de Mocopulli, Diario Austral de Llanquihue. 2003.

Conflicts in 1824
Battles involving Chile
Battles involving Spain
Battles of the Spanish American wars of independence
Battles of the Chilean War of Independence
1824 in Chile
History of Chiloé
April 1824 events